Sarthak Ranjan (born 25 September 1996) is an Indian cricketer who plays for Delhi. He made his Twenty20 debut on 2 January 2016 in the 2015–16 Syed Mushtaq Ali Trophy. He made his List A debut for Delhi in the 2016–17 Vijay Hazare Trophy on 25 February 2017. He made his first-class debut for Delhi in the 2018–19 Ranji Trophy on 20 November 2018.

References

External links
 

1996 births
Living people
Indian cricketers
Delhi cricketers
Cricketers from Delhi